Colonia Soto is a rural community located in Chihuahua Municipality, Chihuahua, Mexico. It had a population of 177 inhabitants at the 2010 census, and is situated at an elevation of 1,681 meters above sea level.

References

Populated places in Chihuahua (state)